Hilma Maria Valjakka (née Nykänen; 29 May 1881, in Pieksämäki – 14 February 1934) was a Finnish politician. She was a member of the Parliament of Finland from 1919 to 1930, representing the Social Democratic Party of Finland (SDP).

References

1881 births
1934 deaths
People from Pieksämäki
People from Mikkeli Province (Grand Duchy of Finland)
Social Democratic Party of Finland politicians
Members of the Parliament of Finland (1919–22)
Members of the Parliament of Finland (1922–24)
Members of the Parliament of Finland (1924–27)
Members of the Parliament of Finland (1927–29)
Members of the Parliament of Finland (1929–30)
20th-century Finnish women politicians
Women members of the Parliament of Finland